Jericho (also known as Mmatope-a-Seretsana in Setswana) is a village in Bojanala Platinum District in the North West province of South Africa. It is under the Bakwena ba Mogopa tribal authority.

Schools  
Charles Mmamogale Primary School
Mmatope Primary School 
Mafale Primary School
Kwena Ya Madiba High School now known as Madiba A Toloane.

References

Populated places in the Madibeng Local Municipality